Jubb'adin or Ġuppaҁōḏ (- ) is a village in southern Syria, administratively part of the Rif Dimashq Governorate, located northeast of Damascus in the Qalamoun Mountains. Nearby localities include Saidnaya and Rankous to the southwest, Yabroud and Maaloula to the northeast, and Assal al-Ward to the northwest. 

According to the Syria Central Bureau of Statistics, Jubb'adin had a population of 3,778 in the 2004 census. However, that number has likely decreased during the Syrian Civil War as a result of combat casualties and emigration. The village's inhabitants are predominantly Sunni Muslims.

The village is among the three last remaining villages where Western Neo-Aramaic is still spoken. Most of the younger people in the village are bilingual and speak both Western Neo-Aramaic and Syrian Arabic fluently. Jubb'adin is the main source of modern poetry written in the Western Neo-Aramaic language thanks to its many poets. The environment is colder than most other Syrian cities and villages due to its altitude. 

The main mosque in the village is called Jemҁa rāb or 'the large mosque' in Aramaic.

Etymology
The etymology of the village's name remains controversial. It is believed to be composed of two parts. The first part is ġuppa, which is Aramaic for 'well' and second part is ҁōḏ, which has several possible meanings. It could mean 'feast', making the name to mean 'the well of the feast'. 

Another possibility is that it is a reference to Audis who founded Audianism, a sect of Christians in the 4th centry who were founded in Syria and spread into Scythia, in which case the full meaning would be 'the well of Audis'. Another theory, though less likely, is that the word is a reference to the people of ‘Ad, who are mentioned in the Quran.

Notable individuals
Famous individuals from the village include the Syrian actor Jalal Al-Taweel.

References

Populated places in Al-Qutayfah District

 Samples of spoken Jubb'adin Aramaic at the Semitisches Tonarchiv (Semitic Audio Archive)